Masturi may refer to:
 Masrezwan Masturi - a soccer player from Singapore
 Masturi, India - an assembly constituency in Bilaspur district, Chhattisgarh, India. See also: Bilaspur (Lok Sabha constituency).
Maturi - a sub district in Bilaspur, Chhattisgarh
 King Masturi of the Seha River Land, a West Anatolian vassal state of the Hittite Kingdom in the 14th-13th century BCE.